The 2008–09 Vanderbilt Commodores men's basketball team represented Vanderbilt University in the 2008–09 NCAA Division I men's college basketball season. The team competed in the East Division of the Southeastern Conference and finished with an overall record of 19–12 (SEC: 8–8). They were led by Kevin Stallings, in his ninth year as head coach, and played their home games at Memorial Gymnasium in Nashville, Tennessee. It was their sixth straight winning season, although they failed to play in a post-season tournament for the first time in five years.

The previous year's 2007–08 team finished 26–8 and ranked 25th in both the AP Poll and the ESPN/USA Today (Coaches) poll.

Entering the season, Vanderbilt was picked by the media attending the SEC's media days in October to finish 4th in the SEC East, behind Tennessee, Florida and Kentucky.

Vanderbilt lost three starters from the previous year's team—2008 SEC-player of the year swingman Shan Foster (20.3 ppg), shooting guard Alex (Red) Gordon (10.8 ppg) and power forward Ross Neltner (8.3 ppg) – and returned two starters—sophomore center A.J. Ogilvy and junior point guard Jermaine Beal. With no seniors and only two juniors (Beal and junior guard George Drake), the Commodores were one of the youngest team's in Division I.

Ogilvy, the Commodores' leading rebounder (6.7 rpg) and second leading scorer (17.0 ppg) the previous season, was selected by the SEC media and SEC coaches to the pre-season all-SEC first team.

Roster

1 Missed the season after torn ACL against MTSU.
2 Walk-on.

Source: ESPN.com

2008–09 schedule and results

|-
!colspan=9| Exhibition

|-
!colspan=9| Regular season

|-
!colspan=9| SEC tournament

References

Vanderbilt Commodores men's basketball seasons
Vanderbilt
Vanderbilt Commodores men's basketball
Vanderbilt Commodores men's basketball